Liudmyla Danylina (born 11 September 1985) is a Ukrainian Paralympic athlete competing in T20-classification middle-distance running events. In 2021, she won the silver medal in the women's 1500 metres T20 event at the 2020 Summer Paralympics in Tokyo, Japan. She also represented Ukraine at the 2016 Summer Paralympics in Rio, Brazil and she won the bronze medal in the women's 1500 metres T20 event.

Career 

She won the silver medal in the women's 1500 metres T20 event at the 2017 World Para Athletics Championships held in London, United Kingdom. She also won the silver medal at the women's 1500 metres T20 event at the 2019 World Para Athletics Championships held in Dubai, United Arab Emirates.

At the 2018 World Para Athletics European Championships held in Berlin, Germany, she won the silver medal in the women's 800 metres T20 event and also the silver medal in the women's 1500 metres T20 event.

She qualified to compete in the women's 1500 metres T20 event at the 2020 Summer Paralympics in Tokyo, Japan after winning the silver medal at the 2019 World Para Athletics Championships held in Dubai, United Arab Emirates.

Achievements

References

External links 
 

Living people
1985 births
Place of birth missing (living people)
Medalists at the 2016 Summer Paralympics
Medalists at the 2020 Summer Paralympics
Athletes (track and field) at the 2016 Summer Paralympics
Athletes (track and field) at the 2020 Summer Paralympics
Paralympic athletes of Ukraine
Paralympic silver medalists for Ukraine
Paralympic bronze medalists for Ukraine
Paralympic medalists in athletics (track and field)
Ukrainian female middle-distance runners
20th-century Ukrainian women
21st-century Ukrainian women